The North Carolina General Assembly of April to June 1784 met in New Bern from April 19 to June 3, 1784. The assembly consisted of the 120 members of the North Carolina House of Commons and 50 senators of North Carolina Senate elected by the voters in April 1784.  As prescribed by the 1776 Constitution of North Carolina, the General Assembly elected Alexander Martin to continue as Governor of North Carolina.  In addition, the assembly elected members of the Council of State.

Legislation
This General Assembly passed an act that changed the date of elections from April to the third Friday in August every year and changed the first meeting of the General Assembly to the first Monday in October.  That is why there were two General Assemblies in 1783, one that started in April and one that started in October.  It was difficult for legislatures to leave their farms and businesses in April to attend the assembly.  It was more convenient for them to attend the assembly in the winter.  The assembly also passed acts to raise taxes on imports, transfer land in the west to the federal government to pay for war debt, and take care of Revolutionary War veterans.  For additional laws and minutes of the 1784 General Assembly, see Legislative Documents.

Councilors of State

As prescribed by the 1776 Constitution of North Carolina, the General Assembly elected the governor and the following members of the North Carolina Council of State on May 8, 1784:
 Thomas Polk, Mecklenburg County (President)
 Pleasant Henderson, Granville County (Clerk)
 Robert Bignall, Edgecombe County
 Philemon Hawkins, Sr., Warren County
 Nathaniel Macon, Mecklenburg County
 James Saunders, Caswell County
 Thomas Eaton, Warren County
James Glasgow continued to serve as North Carolina Secretary of State.  Alfred Moore continued to serve as the North Carolina Attorney General.

Assembly membership

There were 55 counties for this assembly.   Each County was authorized two delegates to the House of Commons and one delegate to the Senate.   In addition, there were six Districts, which were large towns.  The Districts were authorized to elect one delegate each to the House of Commons.  During the 1783 General Assembly, Davidson County and Greene County were created.  These counties were represented in the House of Commons for the first time in the 1784 General Assembly. Sullivan, Washington, Davidson, and Green counties became part of Tennessee in 1796.  Sampson and Moore Counties were also formed in 1784 and sent their first delegates to the General Assembly.  For this assembly, Cumberland County had changed its name to Fayette County but changed the name back to Cumberland County for the next assembly in October.

In April 1784, this assembly voted "to give Congress the  lying between the Allegheny Mountains" (as the entire Appalachian range was then called) "and the Mississippi River" to help offset its war debts. This area was a large part of what had been the Washington District (usually referred to simply as the Western Counties). These western counties had originally been acquired by lease from the Overhill Cherokee, out of which the Watauga Republic had arisen.

The North Carolina cession to the federal government had a stipulation that Congress would have to accept responsibility for the area within two years, which, for various reasons, it was reluctant to do. The cession effectively left the western settlements of North Carolina alone in dealing with the Cherokee of the area, many of whom had not yet made peace with the new nation. These developments were not welcomed by the frontiersmen, who had pushed even further westward, gaining a foothold on the western Cumberland River at Fort Nashborough (now Nashville), or the Overmountain Men, many of whom had settled in the area during the days of the old Watauga Republic. Inhabitants of the region feared that the cash-starved federal Congress might even be desperate enough to sell the frontier territory to a competing foreign power (such as France or Spain).

A few months later, a newly elected North Carolina General Assembly of October 1784 reevaluated the situation. Realizing the land could not at that time be used for its intended purpose of paying the debts of Congress and weighing the perceived economic loss of potential real estate opportunities, it rescinded the offer of cession and re-asserted its claim to the remote western district.  The North Carolina lawmakers ordered judges to hold court in the western counties and arranged to enroll a brigade of soldiers for defense, appointing John Sevier to form it.

House of Commons members

The House of Commons delegates elected a Speaker (Thomas Benbury), Clerk (John Hunt), Assistant Clerk, Doorkeeper, and Assistant Doorkeeper.  The following delegates to the House of Commons were elected by the voters of North Carolina to represent each county and district:

Senate members

The Senators elected a President (Richard Caswell), Clerk (John Haywood), Assistant Clerk, Doorkeeper, and Assistant Doorkeeper.  Five counties that were authorized Senators did not send a representative. The following Senators were elected by the voters of North Carolina to represent each county:

Notes

References

1784 April
General Assembly
 1784 April
 1784 April